Venericardia is a widely distributed genus of marine bivalve molluscs, in the family Carditidae.

It is the type genus of subfamily Venericardiinae. The closely related Purpurocardia was for long included here as a subgenus, but is increasingly considered distinct.

Species 
Species of Venericardia include:

 Venericardia amabilis 
 Venericardia bimaculata 
 Venericardia ferruginea 
 Venericardia granulata 
 †Venericardia imbricata (Gmelin, 1791)
 †Venericardia iheringi (Boehm, 1903) 
 Venericardia planicosta

References 

 Powell A. W. B., New Zealand Mollusca, William Collins Publishers Ltd, Auckland, New Zealand 1979 

Carditidae
Bivalve genera
Taxa named by Jean-Baptiste Lamarck